The fig roll or fig bar is a cookie or biscuit consisting of a rolled cake or pastry filled with fig paste.

History
Figs are a popular snack food in most of the world. Originating in northern Asia Minor, traded by the sailors and explorers of the region, they became popular in the Southern and hence hotter parts of the Mediterranean..

As baking developed, the ability to effectively store foods stuffs and increasing their duration as longer distances were travelled.

Figs were highly traded and fought over during the development of the great trade routes during the 15th to 17th centuries. Christopher Columbus devoted a complete page to what a wonderful time it would be when he would be able to gorge himself on figs in the orient, while Marco Polo described women in association with the beauty of figs. It was also during this period that figs reached America, when the Spanish reached the island of Hispaniola in 1520.

Mass production
 
In 1892 James Henry Mitchell, a Florida engineer and inventor, received a patent for a machine that could produce a hollow tube of cookie dough and simultaneously fill it with jam. At the same time, Philadelphia baker and fig lover Charles Roser was developing a recipe for a pastry based on the homemade fig roll likely brought to the US by immigrants from Britain. Roser approached the Cambridgeport, Massachusetts based Kennedy Biscuit Company, who agreed to take on production and sales.

Kennedy Biscuit Company had recently become associated with the New York Biscuit Company, and after merger to form Nabisco, trade marked the product as the Fig Newton.

Now a trademarked product of Nabisco, the unusual shape of Fig Newtons is a characteristic that has been adopted by many competitors, such as the generic fig bars sold by most supermarkets, and Newman's Own Fig Newmans (an organic variety).

The Britannia Industries in India produces Fig Rolls.

See also

 Birnbrot
 List of cookies
 List of pastries

Footnotes and references

External links
 21st Century Fig Festival - a comparison of fig rolls
 Felicity Cloake: How to make the perfect fig rolls

Arab cuisine
Egyptian cuisine
Turkish cuisine
Cypriot cuisine
Syrian cuisine
Lebanese cuisine
Levantine cuisine
Israeli cuisine
Turkish Cypriot cuisine
Pastries
Snack foods
Fig dishes